Luna Bijl is a Dutch fashion model. She is known as one of late designer Karl Lagerfeld’s muses. Bijl currently ranks as one of the "Top 50" models in the fashion industry. In 2018, she appeared on 8 Vogue covers, including Vogue Paris.

Career
Bijl debuted at S/S 2016 fashion week. In her "breakout" 2017 season, she walked for designers such as Alexander Wang, Louis Vuitton, and Chanel. In 2016, she was on the cover of Vogue Paris twice making her the first model to appear twice in one year. Bijl has done campaigns for Emporio Armani, Chloé, Mango, Zara, Louis Vuitton, and TOM FORD.

Bijl was nominated for models.com’s "Model of the Year" in 2017.

References 

1998 births
Living people
Dutch female models